The Primetime Emmy Award for Outstanding Individual Performance in a Variety or Music Program was an annual award given to performers in a variety/music series or specials. The award has been retired; it was last presented in 2008.

Winners and nominations

1950s

1960s

1970s

1980s

1990s

2000s

Total awards by network
 CBS – 25
 NBC – 12
 PBS – 10
 HBO – 7
 ABC – 5
 A&E – 2
 Fox – 2
 Syndicated – 1

Performers with multiple awards

4 awards
 Harvey Korman (2 consecutive)

3 awards
 Tim Conway
 Billy Crystal

2 awards
 Mikhail Baryshnikov
 Tony Bennett
 Carol Burnett (consecutive)
 Art Carney (consecutive)
 Cloris Leachman
 Bette Midler
 Leontyne Price (consecutive)
 Barbra Streisand
 Tracey Ullman
 Robin Williams (consecutive)

Performers with multiple nominations

14 nominations
 Billy Crystal

9 nominations
 Tracey Ullman

7 nominations
 Harvey Korman

6 nominations
 Tim Conway
 Lily Tomlin

5 nominations
 Mikhail Baryshnikov
 Dana Carvey
 David Letterman
 Jon Stewart

4 nominations
 Carol Burnett
 Ellen DeGeneres
 Whoopi Goldberg
 Julie Kavner
 Vicki Lawrence
 Robin Williams

3 nominations
 Wayne Brady
 George Carlin
 Stephen Colbert
 Arte Johnson
 Angela Lansbury
 Cloris Leachman
 Dinah Shore
 Barbra Streisand

2 nominations
 Edie Adams
 Debbie Allen
 Fred Astaire
 Harry Belafonte
 John Belushi
 Tony Bennett
 Ruth Buzzi
 Art Carney
 Chevy Chase
 Perry Como
 Plácido Domingo
 Judy Garland
 Goldie Hawn
 Gregory Hines
 Hugh Jackman

 Danny Kaye
 Patti LaBelle
 Jay Leno
 Jon Lovitz
 Bill Maher
 Bette Midler
 Dennis Miller
 Liza Minnelli
 Rita Moreno
 Luciano Pavarotti
 Leontyne Price
 Gilda Radner
 Chris Rock
 Sarah Vaughan
 Andy Williams

Notes

References

Individual Performance in a Variety or Music Program
Awards established in 1959
Awards disestablished in 2008